Kelly Biggs (born 5 October 1977 in East Ham, London), better known by her stage name Kele Le Roc, is a British R&B and UK garage singer.

Career
Biggs began singing at the age of three, and she attended Langdon Comprehensive School in East Ham. She first found widespread acclaim in 1995 with the underground hit "Let Me Know". She scored two top 10 hits on the UK Singles Chart, with "Little Bit of Lovin'" in 1998 and "My Love" in 1999; both peaked at No. 8. In March 1999, she released her only album, Everybody's Somebody on Polydor Records.

In 1999, she won two MOBO Awards, for Best Newcomer and for Best Single ("My Love"). Among those she collaborated with are Basement Jaxx (with whom she reached No. 6 in the UK with "Romeo"), 10° Below, Coolio, Courtney Pine, Shy FX, T Power, Omar Lye-Fook, Damage and Lee Henry.

Discography

Album
Everybody's Somebody (1999, Wild Card) – UK #44

Singles
"Let Me Know" (1995, Orchestrated Noize)
"Little Bit of Lovin'" (1998, 1st Avenue/Wild Card/Polydor) - UK #8
"My Love" (1999, 1st Avenue/Wild Card/Polydor) – UK #8
"Thinking of You" (2000, Telstar) – UK #70 †
"Feelin' U" (2003, London) – UK #34 ‡
"Retro" (2009, Freelance Diva/OceanFall)
As featured artist
"Romeo" with Basement Jaxx (2001)
"Things We Do for Love" with Sticky (2003)
"Let Me Be Your Fantasy" with Gok Wan & Craig Knight (2020)

† Credited to Curtis Lynch Jr. featuring Kele Le Roc and Red Rat
‡ Credited to Shy FX and T Power featuring Kele Le Roc

References

1977 births
Living people
21st-century Black British women singers
British contemporary R&B singers
People from East Ham
UK garage singers
English women pop singers
Singers from London
20th-century Black British women singers